The Invasion of Guadeloupe was a British attempt in 1794 to take and hold the island of Guadeloupe in the West Indies during the 1789-1799 French Revolutionary Wars. The British had negotiated with the French planters, Ignace-Joseph-Philippe de Perpignan and Louis de Curt, who wished to gain British protection, as the French Constitutional Assembly was passing a law abolishing slavery on 4 February 1794. The Whitehall Accord was signed on 19 February 1794 while the British were securing Martinique in the Battle of Martinique (1794).  Troops led by General Charles Grey landed on 11 April 1794, assisted by a fleet led by Admiral Sir John Jervis. On 24 April French General Collot surrendered the last stronghold at Basse-Terre, leaving the island in the hands of the British and their French Royalist supporters. On 4 June a French fleet landed troops under the command of Victor Hugues who, with the assistance of French Republican locals, helped by the effect of yellow fever and other tropical diseases on the British forces, regained full control of the island by 10 December 1794.

Troops and people involved
 6th Regiment of Foot
 43rd Regiment of Foot
 Major-General Thomas Dundas (appointed governor of Guadeloupe, but died of Yellow Fever 3 June 1794)

References

 

Battles involving Great Britain
Battles involving France
Battles of the French Revolutionary Wars
Conflicts in 1794
Invasion
1794
1794 in the Caribbean
Invasions by Great Britain
18th century in Guadeloupe